Sporonema phacidioides is a plant pathogen infecting alfalfa.

External links 
 Index Fungorum
 USDA ARS Fungal Database

Fungal plant pathogens and diseases
Helotiaceae